The Liberal Democratic Party was a Chilean political party, which took formal existence in 1876, created to support the presidential candidacy of Benjamín Vicuña Mackenna.

References 

Liberal parties in Chile
Political parties established in 1875
Political parties disestablished in 1886
Defunct political parties in Chile
1875 establishments in Chile
1886 disestablishments in Chile